François Picard (1879, Dijon (Côte-d'Or) - 1939, Paris) was a French naturalist  who specialised in botany and entomology. He wrote Faune de France  Volume n° 20 (1879-1939)  Coléoptères Cérambycidae 1929, 168 p. He was a Member of the Société Entomologique de France.

References

 CTHS
Groll, E. K. (2017). Biographies of the Entomologists of the World. Online database, version 8. Senckenberg Deutsches Entomologisches Institut, Müncheberg

French entomologists
Presidents of the Société entomologique de France
20th-century French botanists
1939 deaths
1879 births